Narenj Kola may refer to:
 Narenj Kola-ye Olya
 Narenj Kola-ye Sofla